"Maybe" is the lead single from American singer Teyana Taylor's major label debut album, VII.  The track features guest verses by American rappers Pusha T and Yo Gotti.

Background
The song was premiered on June 16, 2014 by Teyana as she announced the release date of her album.

Music video
The music video was released on August 22, 2014 and was directed by Brendan Cochrane.

Charts

Certifications

References

2014 singles
Def Jam Recordings singles
Teyana Taylor songs
Pusha T songs
Yo Gotti songs
Songs written by Pusha T
Songs written by Yo Gotti
Songs written by Dre Moon